Veppam is a 2011 Indian Tamil-language crime action film written and directed by newcomer Anjana Ali Khan, starring Nani, Nithya Menen, Karthik Kumar, and Bindu Madhavi. The film marks Nani's Tamil debut. The story narrates events from the slum areas of Chennai, showcasing characters and their struggles. The film, jointly produced by Gautham Vasudev Menon's Photon Kathaas and R. S. Infotainment, had been in production for over one year. The film released on 29 July 2011, while a dubbed Telugu version, titled Sega, released simultaneously in Andhra Pradesh. Veppam received mixed reviews.

Plot 
The film starts by showing a girl named Revathy (Nithya Menen) forwarding towards the beach and drowning herself in the ocean. The film is then set 18 years back in a slum in Chennai. Balaji's (Muthukumar) mother dies, and his father, Jyothi (Sheimour), a drunkard, leaves him on the streets. Balaji works hard and ensures a decent living for his younger brother Karthik (Nani) with the help of Revathy's father. Karthik, who studies in an engineering college, spends all his time with his friend Vishnu (Karthik Kumar), who is also brought up in the locality.  Revathy, who lives in the neighborhood, loves Karthik. Revathy, Karthik, and Vishnu are close friends. Vishnu also owns a mechanic shop but is not generating enough income. Vishnu's guardian pesters Vishnu to sell it and to look for a decent job which generates enough income to ensure financial security for the foreseeable future, but Vishnu refuses as the shop is the only surviving memory of his late father.

Jyothi takes to illegal ways and makes money working for a drug peddler Ammaji (Jennifer). Balaji does not want his brother Karthik to join with his father Jyothi as he left them on the streets in his young age. Jyothi supplies call girls to men in that locality. Knowing that Vishnu is in love with Viji (Bindu Madhavi), a call girl in the locality, and also needs money as his shop is not earning enough, Jyothi decides to exploit him for his selfish gain of transaction of a drug. He gives him an assignment — to transport drugs to Pondicherry, promising to give him Viji if he completes the work. Vishnu takes the help of Karthik and leaves for Pondicherry. Viji hears that Jyothi is planning to sell the drug to Ammaji's official enemy. She tries to save Vishnu through Jyothi's assistant. Meanwhile, Revathy's father survives a heart attack and is desperate to contact Karthik and Vishnu while in the hospital. Balaji finds Karthik in Jyothi's car and searches for him for a week. Meanwhile, Jyothi's assistant warns Vishnu about Jyothi's plan. Balaji finds Karthik in a bakery after a week and hits him. Karthik, in anger, leaves his house to Vishnu's house, giving a phone to Revathy, leaves the drug in his cupboard. Vishnu searches for the drug in his bag in his house and fights with Karthik. Karthik gets hurt in his head from a chair and faints. Vishnu's guardian kills Vishnu as he wanted to sell the mechanic shop which Vishnu owned. Viji dies in the depression of Vishnu's death. The police arrest Karthik, thinking that he would have killed Vishnu.

Karthik comes out through Jyothi's help. Balaji, Karthik, and Jothi go to Ammaji, where they find that Ammaji's official enemies have joined. They try to kill Jyothi, but Balaji and Karthik save him and kill everybody there, and Jyothi kills Ammaji. They go to Jyothi's house and start drinking, and upon being asked by Jyothi about the drug, Karthik replies that Revathy had found the drug in Karthik's cupboard. She took the drug to Jyothi's house, where a man tried to rape her. She escaped and dissolved the drug in the beach. Later, Balaji gives Jyothi a glass of poisoned beer for he left them alone in their young age, and Karthik joins his brother and kills him for the reason for his friend Vishnu's death. People nearby them agree not to let anyone know that they murdered Jyothi. The film ends as both brothers walk out of the room together.

Cast 
Nani as Karthik 
Karthik Kumar as Vishnu
Nithya Menen as Revathi
Bindu Madhavi as Viji
Jennifer as Ammaji
Sheimour Roosevelt as Jyothi
Muthukumar as Balaji (voice dubbed by Gautham Menon)
Ramdoss as Ammaji's henchman
Mippu as Vishnu's friend
Myna Nandhini

Production 
Veppam was shot in 46 days. Since the story was set in Chennai, it was mostly filmed in and around Chennai, with songs being canned in Mahabalipuram, Pondicherry and Kodaikanal. Anjana revealed that the story revolves around three friends — two boys and one girl — from the slums, played by Nani, Karthik Kumar and Nithya Menen, respectively, with Bindu Madhavi playing the role of a call girl. Nani and Bindu Madhavi had acted in a few Telugu films before and would make their Tamil film debut through Veppam. The film was also supposed to be Nithya Menen's debut Tamil film. However, due to the long delay in production, it would become her second Tamil release after 180. Nani and Nithya had starred together in the Telugu super hit Ala Modalaindi (2011), which prompted the makers to dub and release the film in Telugu as well. Anjana had initially signed up with another producer, but since the project failed to take off, director Gautham Vasudev Menon, under whom she had worked as an assistant director, stepped in and took over the production. Produced for approximately US$550,000, the film's domestic theatrical rights were sold for US$600,000, while the television rights, international theatrical rights and the rights to the Telugu dubbed version had been sold for a total of US$270,000.

Soundtrack 
The film's music was composed by Joshua Sridhar. The soundtrack, which features seven tracks, was released by Suhasini Maniratnam on 31 December 2010.

Release 
Veppam opened to mixed responses. Pavithra Srinivasan of Rediff gave 2.5 out of 5 citing that "a tauter screenplay, more logic in the sequences and realistic dialogues would have made Veppam an eminently enjoyable film". IBNLive described that "the movie has some positives in terms of looks and narrative style, but it lacks the punch." A critic from Sify wrote that "Veppam has everything to hold the audiences interest- romance, drama, violence and slick packaging. It is certainly worth a look." The Times of India wrote, "Swear words and swagger do not , something director Anjana failed to factor in while working on the movie. So while we have some fearsome looking gangsters in well-shot frames, they fail to strike a chord and end up looking like caricatures." Supergoodmovies rated it 2.5/5 and called it "A rich movie, Veppam will be here to stay for some time." Indiaglitz stated the movie as "Watch this racy story for its worth your money." KollyInsider.com rated the movie with 2.5 stars out of 5, stated good fun from starting to end. The Telugu version Sega failed at the box office. Veppam emerged as an average grosser.

References

External links 
 

2010s Tamil-language films
2011 crime action films
2011 directorial debut films
2011 films
Films about organised crime in India
Films set in Chennai
Films shot in Chennai
Films shot in Kodaikanal
Films shot in Puducherry
Indian crime action films
Films scored by Joshua Sridhar